The New Jersey Eagles were an American soccer team founded in 1987 as the Cosmopolitan Eagles.  In 1988, they entered the third American Soccer League as the New Jersey Eagles.  They folded following the 1990 American Professional Soccer League season.

History
Founded as the Cosmopolitan Eagles in 1987, they played an independent exhibition schedule that year.  In 1988, they joined the American Soccer League, moving to the American Professional Soccer League in 1990 when the ASL merged with the Western Soccer League.  League goals leader Jorge Acosta led the team to a first place regular season finish in its first campaign, but it was all downhill after that.  The bright spots of the 1989 and 1990 seasons were the play of the defense, anchored by ex-New York Cosmos players Andranik Eskandarian and Hubert Birkenmeier.  Unfortunately, the offense sputtered in the wake of chronic knee injuries to Acosta, and the team lost many low scoring one-goal games.

The Eagles played their home matches at Paterson, New Jersey's Hinchliffe Stadium during their first two seasons.

Year-by-year

Ownership and staff
 Dominick Flora - President

Head coach
Ed Kelly  1988

Yearly awards
ASL Top Goal Scorer
1988 - Jorge Acosta (14 Goals)

ASL Top Points Scorer
1988 - Jorge Acosta (32 Points)

ASL All-Star Team Selection
1988 - Jorge Acosta Brian Ainscough
1989 - Paul Riley

References

Defunct soccer clubs in New Jersey
American Soccer League (1988–89) teams
American Professional Soccer League teams
1987 establishments in New Jersey
1990 disestablishments in New Jersey
Soccer clubs in New Jersey
Sports in Paterson, New Jersey
Association football clubs established in 1987
Association football clubs disestablished in 1990